Cheater or Cheaters may refer to:

Arts and entertainment

Films
 The Cheaters (1930 film), an Australian silent film
 Cheaters (1934 film), an American film directed by Phil Rosent
 The Cheaters (1945 film), directed by Joseph Kane, also known as The Castaway
 Cheaters (2000 film), a 2000 TV movie starring Jeff Daniels and Jena Malone
 Cheater (film), a 2016 Marathi film starring Vaibbhav Tatwawdi and Pooja Sawant
 The Cheater (1920 film), a lost 1920 silent film drama

Stories
 "Cheater" (short story), a science fiction story from the Ender's Game universe
 "The Cheaters", a short story by Robert Bloch, in the collection Pleasant Dreams: Nightmares

Music
 Cheater (EP), a 2001 EP by Randy
 "The Cheater", a 1966 song by Bob Kuban
 "Cheater", a Judas Priest song from Rocka Rolla
 "Cheater" (song), a 2004 song by Michael Jackson
 "Cheater" a song by The Vamps from the 2015 album Wake Up
 The Cheater, a 2022 album by Lil Gotit

Television
 Cheaters (American TV series), a syndicated reality TV show
 The Cheaters (TV series), a British TV series broadcast 1960–1962
 "Cheaters" (Will & Grace), a two-part episode of Will & Grace
 Cheater, also known as a clip episode
 Cheaters (2022 TV series), a BBC sitcom starring Susie Wokoma

Slang
 Cheater, someone who is known for cheating
 Cheater, oil field jargon for a cheater bar, a wrench extension arm (typically a length of pipe)
 Cheaters, a slang term for reading glasses

See also 
 "Cheater, Cheater", a 2008 debut single from country music duo Joey + Rory
 Cheat (disambiguation)
 Cheetah (disambiguation)
 Cheating (disambiguation)